Poptropica is an online role-playing game, developed in 2007 by Pearson Education's Family Education Network, and targeted towards children aged 6 to 15. Poptropica was primarily the creation of Jeff Kinney, the author of the Diary of a Wimpy Kid series. As of 2015, he remains at the company as the Creative Director. The game primarily focuses on problem-solving through game quest scenarios, called "islands". Islands all center on a problem that the player must resolve by going through multiple obstacles, collecting and using items, talking to various characters, and completing goals. All islands, upon completion, award "credits," which are non-negotiable currency that may be used to buy costumes and special effects in the Poptropica store.

In 2011, Poptropica was listed on Time magazine's list of "50 Websites that Make the Web Great", where it was described as "an inventive megasite for kids with a wholesome and slightly educational bent". By 2012, the game had grown to have over 75 million registered users, with 35 million in the 15-25 age group. Versions of the game have been released on Nintendo DS and 3DS, iOS, and Android mobile devices. In May 2015, it was announced that Family Education Network was sold by Pearson to the interactive-education venture capitalist Sandbox Networks, and that Poptropica had "over 3.2 million monthly unique users in 200 countries and territories".

In 2015, Poptropica was sold to educational-technology investment group, Sandbox Partners.

In 2020, because of the discontinuation of Adobe Flash, Poptropica began porting their old islands that were built on Adobe Flash over to an HTML5 format. As a result of Poptropica'''s utilization of varying Flash engines, a number of islands were unable to be ported immediately, and were effectively removed from the game. Fan archivists later made 35 islands available once again via the Basilisk browser within the Flashpoint program.

In April 2022, Poptropica announced that some of the old islands would return as part of a bundle on Steam. Though delayed by a day, the game was eventually released on May 26, 2022, and includes seventeen islands and Poptropica Realms.

Gameplay

When it first launched in 2007, Poptropica only had one island, titled Early Poptropica Island. By 2017, it had 58 islands to be explored, all with a different theme: examples include Back Lot Island, where the player helps produce a movie, and Super Power Island, where their goal is to defeat six super villains. Each island had its own quest, for which a player could receive an island medallion as well as 150 credits to spend in the in-game Poptropica Store. Starting July 6, 2011, Poptropica allowed players to replay islands without creating a new account, while still keeping track of all the Medallions the player had earned.

Advertisements
In addition to the available island quests, advertisers contract for temporary mini-games that appear on the site, sometimes targeted to players of a certain age group or gender. Regular advertisers have included Disney, Kellogg's Froot Loops, Lego toys, and various animated movies and DVD releases. Advertisement mini-games normally appear only during a two-week period. If the player completes an advertisement mini-game, they receive a temporary prize, usually related to the media being advertised.

A few Poptropica islands are themed after certain book series: these include Big Nate, Timmy Failure, Diary of a Wimpy Kid, and Magic Tree House. These islands are permanent, and can be played at any time. In 2015, a total of seven of these islands became members-only.

Mini-gamesPoptropica features different mini-games that users can play with other people. These include Switch, Sudoku, Hoops, Sky Dive, Paint War, Star Link, Balloons, Soupwords and Pathwise. The game keeps track of how many times the player wins or loses a certain mini-game.

Spin-offs
Poptropica Adventures
In 2012, in partnership with Ubisoft, Poptropica released a video game for the Nintendo DS, titled Poptropica Adventures.

Poptropica: Forgotten Islands
On September 5, 2013, Poptropica launched Poptropica: Forgotten Islands, an iOS game, which allows players to meet new characters and discover story elements about Poptropica by finding artifacts littered throughout the game. It was also released on the Nintendo 3DS system through Ubisoft in 2014. It has been replaced on iOS and Android with a mobile version of the desktop Poptropica game.

Poptropica Worlds
On January 11, 2017, Poptropica announced via their blog that they were introducing another game called Poptropica Worlds, developed in Unity. It was released in spring 2017. Poptropica Worlds has new features, such as redesigned characters, customizable homes, and new islands. Returning players are able to port over their avatar's look and name to Poptropica Worlds. Poptropica Worlds can be played on both the web and mobile. If membership was bought for Poptropica, it carries over to Poptropica Worlds'', and vice versa.

References

External links
 

2007 video games
Browser games
Flash games
Virtual world communities
Massively multiplayer online games
American children's websites
Pearson plc
Role-playing video games
Video games developed in the United States
Video games set on fictional islands